George H. Winner Jr. (born July 31, 1949) is a former New York state senator. A Republican, he served in the New York State Senate from 2005 to 2010, after having spent 13 terms in the New York State Assembly.

Political career and background

Born in Elmira, New York, George Winner is a 1971 graduate of St. Lawrence University. He was admitted to the practice of law in New York in 1977. He is a partner in the Elmira law firm of Keyser, Maloney, Winner LLP and is a member of the Chemung County, New York and New York State Bar Associations. Winner was counsel and legislative assistant to Senate Deputy Majority Leader William T. Smith from 1971 to 1978. He is married to the former Lynn Hardman, and they have three daughters.

He was a member of the New York State Assembly from 1979 to 2004, sitting in the 183rd, 184th, 185th, 186th, 187th, 188th, 189th, 190th, 191st, 192nd, 193rd, 194th and 195th New York State Legislatures.

He was a member of the New York State Senate from 2005 to 2010, sitting in the 196th, 197th and 198th New York State Legislatures. He represented the 53rd senatorial district which comprised Chemung, Schuyler, Steuben and Yates counties, the city and town of Ithaca, New York, and the towns of Enfield, Newfield and Ulysses in Tompkins County. He served as Chairman of the Committee on Investigations and Government Operations.

Winner, who received statewide attention after leading a Senate investigation of the Spitzer administration in 2007, considered running for New York State Attorney General in 2010. He was also mentioned as a potential candidate to run against Eric Massa for the United States House of Representatives seat representing New York's 29th congressional district in 2010.

Winner unexpectedly announced his retirement from the state senate on June 2, 2010. Since his retirement, he has operated the Rescue New York political action committee.

Notes

1949 births
Living people
St. Lawrence University alumni
Republican Party members of the New York State Assembly
Republican Party New York (state) state senators
Politicians from Elmira, New York
21st-century American politicians